Trine Lise Sundnes (born 6 February 1970) is a Norwegian politician and trade unionist.

She was elected representative to the Storting from the constituency of Oslo for the period 2021–2025, for the Labour Party.

Sundnes was board member of the International Labour Organization (ILO) from 2008 to 2014, and has been chairman of the board of the United Nations Association of Norway since 2015.

References

1970 births
Living people
Politicians from Oslo
Labour Party (Norway) politicians
Members of the Storting